Shakamak Junior-Senior High School is a middle school and high school located in Jasonville, Indiana.

See also
 List of high schools in Indiana

References

External links
Official Website

Public high schools in Indiana
Schools in Greene County, Indiana